Chicago is a 2002 American musical black comedy crime film based on the 1975 stage musical of the same name which in turn originated in the 1926 play of the same name. It explores the themes of celebrity, scandal, and corruption in Chicago during the Jazz Age. The film stars an ensemble cast led by Renée Zellweger, Catherine Zeta-Jones, and Richard Gere. Chicago centers on Roxie Hart (Zellweger) and Velma Kelly (Zeta-Jones), two murderers who find themselves in jail together awaiting trial in 1920s Chicago. Roxie, a housewife, and Velma, a vaudevillian, fight for the fame that will keep them from the gallows. The film marks the directorial debut of Rob Marshall, who also choreographed the film, and was adapted by screenwriter Bill Condon, with music by John Kander and lyrics by Fred Ebb.

Chicago was critically acclaimed, with particular praise given to the performances of the cast. The film went on to win six Academy Awards in 2003, including Best Picture, making it the first musical to win Best Picture since Oliver! in 1968. For her performance, Zeta-Jones won the Academy Award for Best Supporting Actress, the British Academy Film Award for Best Actress in a Supporting Role, and the Critics' Choice Movie Award for Best Supporting Actress. Zellweger won the Golden Globe Award for Best Actress – Motion Picture Comedy or Musical, and Gere won the Golden Globe Award for Best Actor – Motion Picture Musical or Comedy.

Plot
In 1924, chorus girl Roxie Hart watches lead Velma Kelly perform ("Overture/All That Jazz") at The Onyx, a Chicago theater. Seeking stardom, Roxie begins an affair with furniture salesman Fred Casely, who claims to know the manager. After the show, Velma is arrested for killing her husband Charlie and sister Veronica, after catching them in bed together.

A month later, Casely admits that he lied in order to sleep with her. Enraged, Roxie shoots him dead. She convinces her gullible husband, Amos, to take the blame, telling him she killed a burglar in self-defense. As Amos confesses, Roxie fantasizes a musical number devoted to her husband ("Funny Honey"). However, when the detective brings up evidence of Roxie's affair with Casely, Amos recants; Roxie furiously admits the truth and is arrested. Ambitious District Attorney Martin Harrison announces he will seek the death penalty.

At Cook County Jail, Roxie is sent to Murderess' Row, supervised by the corrupt Matron "Mama" Morton ("When You're Good to Mama"). Roxie meets her idol Velma, but her friendship is rudely rebuffed. She learns the backstories of the other women there, including Velma ("Cell Block Tango"). On Morton's advice, Roxie engages Velma's lawyer, the brilliant Billy Flynn ("All I Care About"). Flynn and Roxie manipulate the press, reinventing Roxie as an originally virtuous Southern woman corrupted by the fast life of the city; she claims that she had the affair with Casely because Amos was always working, but repented and left Casely for Amos, and Casely jealously attacked her ("We Both Reached for the Gun"). The press believe the story; praised by the public as a tragic heroine, Roxie becomes an overnight sensation ("Roxie"). Velma, unhappy at losing the public's attention, tries to convince Roxie to join her act, replacing the sister that she murdered ("I Can't Do It Alone"), but Roxie, now the more popular of the two rivals, snubs her just as Velma originally snubbed Roxie.

Meanwhile, wealthy heiress "Go-to-Hell" Kitty Baxter, is arrested for murdering her husband and his two mistresses, and the press and Flynn focus more on her. To Velma's surprise, Roxie quickly steals back the fame by claiming pregnancy. Amos is ignored by the press ("Mister Cellophane"), and Flynn, to create more sympathy for Roxie, convinces him that the child is Casely's, and that he should divorce Roxie in the middle of her predicament. Roxie over-confidently fires Flynn, believing she can now win on her own. However, when Katalin Helinszki, a Hungarian woman on Murderess' Row (who happens to be the only inmate to protest and insist on her own innocence), becomes the first woman in Cook County history to be executed by hanging, Roxie realizes the gravity of the situation and rehires Flynn.

Roxie's trial begins, and Billy turns it into a media spectacle ("Razzle Dazzle") with the help of the sensationalist newspaper reporters and radio personality Mary Sunshine. Billy discredits witnesses, manipulates evidence and even stages a public reconciliation between Amos and Roxie when she claims the child is his. The trial seems to be going well for Roxie until Velma appears with Roxie's diary, reading incriminating entries in exchange for amnesty in her own case. Billy discredits the diary, implying that Harrison was the one who planted the evidence ("A Tap Dance"). Roxie is acquitted, but her fame is eclipsed moments later when another woman, who had also shot her own husband, shoots her lawyer just outside the courthouse. Flynn tells her to accept it, and admits that he tampered with her diary himself, in order to incriminate the DA and also free two clients simultaneously. Amos remains loyal and excited to be a father, but Roxie cruelly reveals that her pregnancy is false, and he finally leaves her.

Roxie does become a vaudeville performer but is very unsuccessful ("Nowadays"). The similarly unsuccessful Velma reapproaches Roxie to suggest performing together as a double act consisting of two murderers. Roxie initially refuses, but later accepts when Velma points out that they can perform together despite their mutual resentment. The two stage a spectacular performance that earns them praise from the audience and the press ("Nowadays / Hot Honey Rag"). The film concludes with Roxie and Velma receiving a standing ovation from an enthusiastic audience (which includes Flynn, Morton, the jurors, and other acquitted murderesses), and proclaiming that, "We couldn't have done it without you".

Cast
 Renée Zellweger as Roxie Hart, a housewife who aspires to be a vaudevillian, and is arrested for the murder of her deceitful paramour Fred Casely. Jennifer Aniston was considered for the role.
 Catherine Zeta-Jones as Velma Kelly, a charismatic vaudevillian who is arrested for the murders of her husband Charlie and sister Veronica after catching them in bed together.
 Richard Gere as Billy Flynn, a duplicitous, greedy, smooth-talking lawyer who turns his clients into celebrities to gain public support for them. Michael Jackson was considered for the role, but Harvey Weinstein heavily objected to the idea of casting Jackson as he felt more attention would be paid to him than the rest of the cast. John Travolta was offered the role but turned it down.
 Queen Latifah as Matron "Mama" Morton, the corrupt but nurturing matron of the Cook County Jail.
 John C. Reilly as Amos Hart, Roxie's naïve, simple-minded but devoted husband.
 Christine Baranski as Mary Sunshine, a sensationalist reporter.
 Taye Diggs as The Bandleader, a shadowy, mystical master of ceremonies who introduces each song.
 Colm Feore as Martin Harrison, the prosecutor in both Roxie and Velma's court cases.
 Lucy Liu as Kitty Baxter, a millionaire heiress who briefly outshines Roxie and Velma when she kills her husband and his two mistresses.
 Dominic West as Fred Casely, Roxie's deceitful paramour and murder victim.
 Jayne Eastwood as Mrs. Borusewicz, the Harts' neighbor from across the hall.
 Chita Rivera as Nicky, a prostitute. Rivera originated the role of Velma in the Broadway musical Chicago in 1975; her appearance in the film is a cameo.
 Mýa as Mona, a prisoner on Murderess' Row who killed her artist boyfriend Al Lipschitz via strangulation after discovering he had multiple affairs.
 Susan Misner as Liz, a prisoner on Murderess' Row who killed her husband Bernie by shooting him twice in the head after he wouldn't stop popping his gum.
 Denise Faye as Annie, a prisoner on Murderess' Row who killed her boyfriend Ezekiel Young by poisoning his drink with arsenic after discovering he was a Mormon with six different wives.
 Deidre Goodwin as June, a prisoner on Murderess' Row who killed her husband Wilbur by stabbing him ten times with her kitchen knife after he angrily accused her out of jealousy of having an affair with the milkman.
 Ekaterina Chtchelkanova as Katalin Helinszki, a Hungarian prisoner on Murderess' Row who insists she is innocent and does not speak English except for two words: "not guilty"; regardless, she is hanged.

Production

Development
The film is based on the 1975 Broadway musical of the same name, which ran for 936 performances but was not well received by audiences, primarily due to its cynical tone. A film adaptation of Chicago was to have been the next project for Bob Fosse, who had directed and choreographed the original 1975 Broadway production and had won an Oscar for his direction of the film version of Cabaret (1972). Although he died before realizing his version, Fosse's distinctive jazz choreography style is evident throughout the 2002 film, and he is thanked in the credits. The minimalist 1996 revival of the musical proved far more successful, having played more than 10,162 performances (as of November 13, 2022), holding records for longest-running musical revival, longest-running American musical on Broadway and second longest-running show in Broadway history. Its runaway success sparked a greater appreciation of the 1975 original production and renewed stalled interest in a long-anticipated film, which incorporates the influences of both productions.

The original production's musical numbers were staged as vaudeville acts; the film respects this but presents them as cutaway scenes in the mind of the Roxie character, while scenes in "real life" are filmed with a hard-edged grittiness. The musical itself was based on a 1926 Broadway play by Maurine Dallas Watkins, a journalist who had found her inspiration in two real-life Chicago trials she had covered for the press, about two real-life Jazz-era murderers Beulah Annan (Roxie Hart) and Belva Gaertner (Velma Kelly). The George Abbott-directed production, starring Francine Larrimore and Juliette Crosby, ran for 172 performances at the Music Box Theatre, and within a year was adapted to a film, in which Gaertner herself had a cameo. Chicago was produced by American companies Miramax Films and The Producers Circle in association with the German company Kallis Productions. Roxie Hart, also known as Chicago or Chicago Gal, is a 1942 American comedy film directed by William A. Wellman and starring Ginger Rogers, Adolphe Menjou and George Montgomery. The film is an adaptation of the 1926 play.

Filming
Principal photography took place in Toronto, Ontario, Canada. The courthouse scene was shot in Osgoode Hall. Other scenes were shot at Queen's Park, the former Gooderham and Worts Distillery, Casa Loma, the Elgin Theatre, Union Station, the Canada Life Building, the Danforth Music Hall, and the Old City Hall.

Music

Several songs from the musical's original score were cut from the film, primarily due to the musical numbers being figments of Roxie's imagination. "Tap Dance", "A Little Bit of Good", "I Can't Do It Alone" (reprise), "My Own Best Friend", "I Know a Girl", "Me and My Baby" and "When Velma Takes the Stand" were removed, and "Class", while filmed and recorded for the soundtrack album, is a deleted scene on the DVD, as well as present as part of an "extended version" from the film's 2005 broadcast premiere on NBC. An instrumental of "Me and My Baby" can be heard in its spot, where Roxie enjoys the renewed fame after claiming she's pregnant.

 "Overture / All That Jazz" – Velma, Company
 "Funny Honey" – Roxie and Amos
 "When You're Good to Mama" – Mama
 "Cell Block Tango" – Velma, Cell Block Girls
 "All I Care About" – Billy, Chorus Girls
 "We Both Reached for the Gun" – Billy, Roxie, Mary, Reporters
 "Roxie" – Roxie, Chorus Boys
 "I Can't Do It Alone" – Velma
 "Chicago After Midnight" (score)
 "Mister Cellophane" – Amos
 "Razzle Dazzle" – Billy, Company
 "Class" (deleted scene) – Velma and Mama
 "A Tap Dance" – Billy
 "Nowadays" – Roxie
 "Nowadays / Hot Honey Rag" – Roxie, Velma
 "I Move On" (end credits) – Roxie, Velma
 "All That Jazz (reprise)" (end credits) – Velma, Company

Release

Home media

Chicago was released by Buena Vista Home Entertainment on DVD in Region 1 (USA, Canada, and US territories) on August 19, 2003. It was released in Full Screen and Widescreen. In addition to this release, a two-disc "Razzle Dazzle" Edition was released over two years later on December 20, 2005, and later, on Blu-ray format, in January 2007 and, in an updated release, in May 2011. The release provides a feature-length audio commentary track with director Marshall and screenwriter Condon. There is also a deleted musical number called "Class", performed by Zeta-Jones and Queen Latifah.

Reception

Box office
Chicago grossed $170,687,518 in the United States and Canada, as well $136,089,214 in other territories. Combined, the film grossed $306,776,732 worldwide, which was, at the time, the highest gross of any film never to reach #1 or #2 in the weekly box office charts in the North American markets (Canada and United States—where it peaked at #3). Worldwide, Chicago was the highest grossing live action musical with $306 million, a record that was then broken by Mamma Mia!.

Critical response

On review aggregation website Rotten Tomatoes, Chicago holds an 86% approval rating, based on 259 reviews, with an average rating of 8.00/10. The site's critics consensus states: "A rousing and energetic adaptation of the Broadway musical, Chicago succeeds on the level of pure spectacle, but provides a surprising level of depth and humor as well." On Metacritic, the film holds a weighted average score of 81 out of 100, based on 39 critics, indicating "universal acclaim". Audiences polled by CinemaScore gave the film an average grade of "A−" on an A+ to F scale.

The cast received widespread acclaim for their performances. Tim Robey, reviewer for The Daily Telegraph, labeled Chicago as "The best screen musical for 30 years." He also stated that it has taken a "three-step tango for us to welcome back the movie musical as a form." Robey stated "This particular Chicago makes the most prolific use it possibly can out of one specific advantage the cinema has over the stage when it comes to song and dance: it's a sustained celebration of parallel montage." Roger Ebert gave the film three-and-a-half stars out of four, calling it "Big, brassy fun". However, other reviews claimed that there were issues with the film being too streamlined, and minor complaints were made toward Marshall's directing influences.

Accolades

Legacy

Chicago, along with the 2001 musical Moulin Rouge! and the hip hop centered film 8 Mile in 2002, is widely considered to be responsible for ushering a re-emergence of the musical film genre in the 21st century. Following the success of Chicago, many movie musicals have been produced for theatrical release, with several adapted from stage productions for Broadway and London's West End, including Phantom of the Opera, The Producers, Rent, Dreamgirls, Hairspray, Sweeney Todd: The Demon Barber of Fleet Street, Mamma Mia!, Nine, Les Misérables, Rock of Ages, The Last Five Years, Into the Woods, Cats, In the Heights, Dear Evan Hansen, tick, tick... BOOM!, West Side Story and more. The 2013 film Sunshine on Leith was also adapted from a stage production, originating with Scotland's Dundee Repertory Theatre.

Japanese rock band Buck-Tick named their 2010 album Razzle Dazzle after the film's song of the same name.

The revived interest in musicals has also brought remakes or sequels to earlier films, including Beauty and the Beast in 2017 (a live-action adaptation of Disney's 1991 animated feature, itself adapted for 1994 Broadway), the 2018 films: Mamma Mia: Here We Go Again! (a sequel to 2008's Mamma Mia!), A Star Is Born (a fourth version of the film following earlier productions in 1937, 1954, and 1976) and Mary Poppins Returns (a sequel to 1964's Mary Poppins), and 2019 films: Aladdin (a live-action adaptation of Disney's 1992 animated feature, itself adapted for Broadway in 2011) and The Lion King (a photorealistic live-action adaptation of Disney's 1994 animated feature, itself adapted for Broadway in 1997). Notable original and biographical musical films have also been released to critical and commercial success since Chicago's run, including Walk the Line (2005), Once (2006), Enchanted (2007), La La Land (2016), Rocketman (2019), and Annette (2021). Other original and biographical musical films released to commercial success with mixed critical reception, includes Across the Universe (2007), The Greatest Showman (2017), Bohemian Rhapsody (2018), Yesterday (2019), Aline (2020), and more.

Many of Chicago's cast and crew have gone on to work in succeeding musicals, including director Marshall (Nine, Into the Woods, Mary Poppins Returns, The Little Mermaid), writer Condon (writer/director for Dreamgirls, director for Beauty and the Beast, writer for The Greatest Showman), costume designer Atwood (Sweeney Todd, Nine, Into the Woods), and actresses Zeta-Jones (Rock of Ages), Latifah (Hairspray), and Baranski (Mamma Mia!, Into the Woods).

Notes

References

External links

 
 
 
 
 

2000s dance films
2000s crime comedy-drama films
American crime comedy-drama films
2000s musical comedy-drama films
2002 films
2003 films
American comedy-drama films
American dance films
American fantasy films
American films based on plays
American musical comedy-drama films
American satirical films
BAFTA winners (films)
Best Musical or Comedy Picture Golden Globe winners
Best Picture Academy Award winners
Edgar Award-winning works
2000s English-language films
Films about capital punishment
Films about lawyers
Films about musical theatre
Films based on adaptations
Films based on musicals
Films directed by Rob Marshall
Films featuring a Best Musical or Comedy Actor Golden Globe winning performance
Films featuring a Best Musical or Comedy Actress Golden Globe winning performance
Films featuring a Best Supporting Actress Academy Award-winning performance
Films scored by Danny Elfman
Films set in Chicago
Films set in 1924
Films set in prison
Films set in the Roaring Twenties
Films shot in Toronto
Films that won the Best Costume Design Academy Award
Films that won the Best Sound Mixing Academy Award
Films whose art director won the Best Art Direction Academy Award
Films whose editor won the Best Film Editing Academy Award
Jazz films
Mariticide in fiction
Films with screenplays by Bill Condon
Sororicide in fiction
Miramax films
Women in prison films
2002 directorial debut films
2000s satirical films
2000s American films